Xenia Grigoryevna Petrova (Russian: Ксения Григорьевна Петрова), also known as Saint Blessed Xenia of St. Petersburg (Russian: Святая блаженная Ксения Петербургская,  – ) is a patron saint of St. Petersburg, who according to tradition, gave all her possessions to the poor after her husband died.

Her husband had been Colonel Andrey Fyodorovich Petrov, a chanter at the Saint Andrew Cathedral. After his death, Xenia became a "fool-for-Christ" and for 45 years wandered around the streets of St. Petersburg, usually wearing her late husband's military uniform.

Xenia's grave is in the Smolensky Cemetery of St. Petersburg. It has been marked by an ornate chapel since 1902. She was canonized by the Russian Orthodox Church Outside Russia on September 24, 1978 (O. S. September 11, 1978) in Synodal Cathedral of Our Lady of the Sign in New York, USA and by Russian Orthodox Church on June 6, 1988 during Local Council of the Russian Orthodox Church.  Her feast day in the O.S. is January 24, which is February 6 in the New Calendar. In July 2020, the Holy Synod of the Romanian Orthodox Church also resolved to include Xenia of St. Petersburg in its calendar on January 24.

As a saint, she is noted for her intercessions in helping those with employment, marriage, the homeless, for fires, for missing children, and for a spouse. She is venerated in several countries. There are about 40 churches and chapels built in her name.

Literary references
Xenia is a major figure in the historical fiction novel The Mirrored World by Debra Dean.

See also
Basil Fool for Christ
Blessed John of Moscow the Fool-For-Christ
John the Hairy
Sign of contradiction

Further reading

 Xenia Cherkaev, "St. Xenia and the Gleaners of Leningrad." The American Historical Review, Volume 125, Issue 3, June 2020, Pages 906–914

References

External links

 Life Of Saint Xenia Of Petersburg by Nun Nectaria McLees
 Life of St. Xenia of St. Petersburg by Jane M. deVyver
 Saint Xenia of Petersbourg Parish in Canada
 St. Xenia Orthodox Church, Methuen, MA, USA (founded 1989)

The 35th Anniversary of the Canonization of St Xenia

1720s births
1800s deaths
18th-century people from the Russian Empire
19th-century people from the Russian Empire
19th-century Christian saints
18th century in Saint Petersburg
Russian saints of the Eastern Orthodox Church
Yurodivy
18th-century Eastern Orthodox Christians 
19th-century Eastern Orthodox Christians 
Christian female saints of the Late Modern era